Bajawa Airport may refer to:

 Bajawa Soa Airport
 Bajawa Pahdamaleda Airport